Iglesia de San Isidoro (Oviedo) is a church in Oviedo, Asturias, Spain. It was opened in 1587.

See also
 Asturian art
 Catholic Church in Spain
 List of Jesuit sites

References

Roman Catholic churches in Oviedo
Churches completed in 1587
Bien de Interés Cultural landmarks in Asturias
16th-century Roman Catholic church buildings in Spain